The Organization Department of the Central Committee of the Chinese Communist Party is a human resource management department of the Central Committee of the Chinese Communist Party that controls staffing positions within the CCP.

The Organization Department is one of the most important organs of the CCP. It is a secretive and highly trusted agency, and forms the institutional heart of the Leninist party system. It controls the more than 70 million party personnel assignments throughout the national system, and compiles detailed and confidential reports on future potential leaders of the Party. The department is known for its highly secretive nature; the state-owned China News Service stated it "always wears a mysterious veil" and historically interacted little with the public or press.

Because the People's Republic of China is a one party state, the Organization Department has an enormous amount of control over its personnel. The Organization Department is indispensable to the CCP's power, and the key to its hold over personnel throughout every level of government and industry. It is one of the key agencies of the Central Committee, along with the Central Propaganda Department and International Liaison Department.

Nomenklatura
The CCP uses the nomenklatura method ("list of names" in Soviet terminology) to determine appointments. The nomenklatura system is how a Leninist ruling party staffs the apparat, exercising organizational hegemony over appointments and dominating the political life of the country.

The central nomenklatura list comprises the top 5,000 positions in the party-state, all of which are controlled by the Organization Department. This includes all ministerial and vice-ministerial positions, provincial governorships and First Party secretary appointments, as well as appointments of university chancellors, presidents of the Academy of Science and Academy of Social Sciences, etc.

Related to the nomenklatura list is the bianzhi (编制) list, which is a list of the authorized number of personnel, as well as their duties and functions in government administrative organs, state enterprises, and service organisations. The bianzhi covers those employed in these organisations, whereas the nomenklatura applies to leadership positions. However, because the Party and its organizational departments are constantly intervening in the personnel and administrative functioning of state institutions, the parallel existence of the bianzhi and nomenklatura systems has become an obstacle to fundamental administrative reform in China.

While the system is from the Soviet Union, "the CPC has taken it to an extreme," Yuan Weishi of Sun Yat-sen University in Guangdong is quoted as saying by the Financial Times. "China is more radical. [The party here] wants to lead everything."

An equivalent of the Organization Department in the United States, according to the Times, would "oversee the appointments of US state governors and their deputies; the mayors of big cities; heads of federal regulatory agencies; the chief executives of General Electric, ExxonMobil, Walmart and 50-odd of the remaining largest companies; justices on the Supreme Court; the editors of The New York Times, The Wall Street Journal and The Washington Post, the bosses of the television networks and cable stations, the presidents of Yale and Harvard and other big universities and the heads of think-tanks such as the Brookings Institution and the Heritage Foundation."

Bruce Gilley and Andrew Nathan write that in the promotion of individual candidates for high positions, a good rating from the Organization Department is essential. The department judges on such qualities as "ideological probity, loyalty to the Party, attitude toward work, and ability to mobilize others." Its research on individuals slated for top positions are "probing" and assessments often acute.

In recent years, the party's Organization Department introduced an evaluation procedure for leading officials (the cadre responsibility system) that aimed to assess regularly the officials' performance and success at implementing policies. Shambaugh also notes the promulgation of Regulations on the Selection and Appointment of Party and Government Leading Cadres in July 2002, writing that the Organization Department has stepped up its evaluation of cadres, including annual appraisal reviews according to various criteria. However, research conducted by Thomas Heberer in China in 2007 revealed that an effective evaluation procedure is not yet in place. Crucial policy areas, such as environmental issues, are not being evaluated, and evaluation is predominantly based on self-assessment.

The nomenklatura system is also facing grave challenges due to the development of the market economy and private entrepreneurship in China. Because Chinese citizens can now achieve upward mobility and the acquisition of resources outside the Party's control, the CCP is no longer the sole stakeholder. This development entails a challenge to the power monopoly of the CCP.

Internal Party documents give frank assessments of the Organization Department's strategy to enhance its control. Before the 16th Party Congress, a set of Temporary Regulations were amended to encourage the appointment of cadres that explicitly supported Jiang Zemin's theory of Three Represents. Jiang's closest ally in the central government, Zeng Qinghong, who headed the Central Organization Department at the time, gave a presentation at a special training session for organization and personnel cadres before the official release of the 2002 regulations. He asserted bluntly that "the work of amending the 'temporary regulations' consists in building a stronger thought, organization, and work style within the whole Party according to the requirements of the 'Three Represents'"

The Organization Department was headed by Li Yuanchao between October 2007 and November 2012. He was replaced by Zhao Leji, the former Shaanxi party secretary. Zhao was in turn replaced by Chen Xi in 2017.

Efforts against corruption
The Central Organization Department played a leading role in the cadre reform drive from 2005 to 2006. In June 1999, the department made efforts to prevent provincial leaders from working in their native provinces in an attempt to prevent corruption.

Senior Party leaders often carry influence in the determination of key positions. The children of Li Peng, for example, came to hold powerful jobs in the power sector where he had ruled; while Zhu Rongji oversaw the finance sector, his son became the highly paid head of China International Capital Corporation, the country's largest investment bank; and Jiang Zemin replaced others when he was the Party official in charge of technology, putting loyalists into top jobs, and his son into a key position.

According to a 2009 report, the buying and selling of official positions also takes place, particularly in small localities, where head of the local Organization Department is among the most sought after positions. The job carries great discretionary power, allowing the wielder the ability to grant jobs to other individuals in return for cash. At lower levels, the practice has been characterised by bribery, corruption, treachery, and "sheer desperate self-interest," according to the Financial Times, which examined internal documents produced by the Organization Department in Jilin Province.

List of the Heads of Department
Zhang Guotao: July 1921 － June 1923
Mao Zedong: May 1924 － January 1925
Chen Duxiu: January 1925 － April 1927
Zhang Guotao (second time): April 1927 － July 1927
Li Weihan: August 1927 － September 1927
Luo Yinong: September 1927 － January 1928 (head of the Organization Department Office)
Zhou Enlai: January 1928 － February 1930
Xiang Ying: November 1928 (acting)
Xiang Zhongfa: February 1930 － August 1930 (leader of the Organization Department)
Zhou Enlai (second time): February 1930 － March 1930 (actual head of the Organization Department)
Li Lisan: March 1930 － August 1930 (actual head of the Organization Department)
Zhou Enlai (third time): September 1930 － January 1931
Kang Sheng: January 1931 － March 1931
Li Zhusheng: March 1931 － December 1931 (acting)
Kang Sheng (second time): December 1931 － Late 1932 (head of the Organization Bureau)
Huang Li: 1932
Kong Yuan: Late 1932 － January 1933 (head of the Organization Bureau)
Ren Bishi: January 1933 － March 1933 
Li Weihan (second time): March 1933 － November 1935 (head of the Organization Bureau)
Zhou Enlai (fourth time): November 1935 － 1935 (leader of the Organization Bureau)
Li Weihan (third time): 1935 － September 1936 (head of the Organization Department of the CCP Northwest Bureau)
Zhang Wentian: September 1936 － October 1936 (acting)
Guo Hongtao: October 1936 － February 1937 (acting)
Bo Gu: February 1937 － December 1937
Chen Yun: December 1937 － March 1944 (incapacitated in March 1943)
Peng Zhen: March 1944 － April 1953 (acting until August 1945)
Rao Shushi: April 1953 － April 1954
Deng Xiaoping: April 1954 － November 1956
An Ziwen: November 1956 － August 1966
Nie Jifeng: August 1966 － ? (leader of the Organization Department Working Group)
Zhu Guang: ? － ? (leader of the Organization Department Working Group)
Yang Shirong: ? － October 1967 (acting leader of the Organization Department as leader of the Special Investigation Group)
Guo Yufeng: October 1967 － August 1973 (leader of the Organization Department Working Group)
Kang Sheng (second time): November 1970 － December 1975 (leader of the Central Organization and Propaganda Leading Group)
Guo Yufeng: August 1973 － June 1975 (leader of the Central Leading Group of the Organization Department)
Guo Yufeng: June 1975 － December 1977)
Hu Yaobang: December 1977- December 1978 
Song Renqiong: December 1978 － February 1983 
Qiao Shi: April 1984 － July 1985 
Wei Jianxing: July 1985 － May 1987 
Song Ping: May 1987 － December 1989 
Lü Feng: December 1989 － October 1994 
Zhang Quanjing: October 1994 － March 1999
Zeng Qinghong: March 1999 － October 2002 
He Guoqiang: October 2002 － October 2007 
Li Yuanchao: October 2007 － November 2012
Zhao Leji: November 2012 － October 2017
Chen Xi: October 2017 － incumbent

References 

Institutions of the Central Committee of the Chinese Communist Party
1921 establishments in China